Kapalabhati ("Skull-polishing") is an important shatkarma, a purification in hatha yoga. The word kapalabhati is made up of two Sanskrit words: kapāla meaning "skull", and bhāti meaning "shining, illuminating". It is intended mainly for cleaning the sinuses but according to the Gheranda Samhita has magical curative effects. There are three forms of Kapalabhati: 

 Vatakrama, a practice similar to the pranayama technique of Bhastrika or "Breath of Fire", except that exhalation is active while inhalation is passive, the opposite of normal breathing.
 Vyutkrama, a practice similar to Jala neti, it involves sniffing water through the nostrils and letting it flow down into the mouth, and then spitting it out.
 Sheetkrama, essentially the reverse of Vyutkrama, in which water is taken through the mouth and expelled through the nose.

See also
 Kundalini energy
 Tummo#Practice
 Uddiyana bandha

References

Kriyas
Shatkarmas
Pranayama